Bing Crosby Sings with Lionel Hampton, Eddie Heywood, Louis Jordan is a Decca Records compilation album of phonograph records by Bing Crosby, Lionel Hampton, Eddie Heywood and Louis Jordan.

Background
Bing Crosby had enjoyed unprecedented success during the 1940s with his discography showing six No. 1 hits in 1944 alone. His films such as Going My Way and The Bells of St. Mary's were huge successes as were the Road films he made with Bob Hope. On radio, his Kraft Music Hall and Philco Radio Time shows were very popular. Decca Records built on this by issuing a number of 78rpm album sets, some featuring freshly recorded material and others utilizing Crosby's back catalogue. Ten of these sets were released in 1946, nine in 1947 and nine more in 1948. Most of these 78rpm albums were reissued as 10" vinyl LP's in subsequent years. 
 
Bing Crosby Sings with Lionel Hampton, Eddie Heywood, Louis Jordan includes only one song which had already been a hit and this was "(Yip Yip De Hootie) My Baby Said Yes" but the album was notable for the accompaniment from several jazz greats.

Reception
The reviewer for Billboard said:
This album would be worth a 90 rating but Decca's pressings, leave us face it, are loaded with surface noise. This deficiency, seemingly aggravated of late, may be minor for routine "singles"; in an album the consumer kickbacks could be important. Apart from bad surface, the material here consists of all old Bing singles on which he doubled. It's great stuff in collection. Outstanding are the Eddie Heywood-Bing pairing on "Who's Sorry Now" and Bing with Jordan on "My Baby Said Yes". (Retail rating 85).

Track listing
The songs were featured on a four 10" 78 rpm album set, Decca Album No. A-634.

References 

Bing Crosby compilation albums
Decca Records compilation albums
1948 compilation albums